is a Japanese manga series written and illustrated by Ruka Kobachi. It has been serialized on Shogakukan's online platform Sunday Webry since November 2017.

Publication
Written and illustrated by Ruka Kobachi, Hana ni Arashi started on Shogakukan's online platform Sunday Webry on November 24, 2017. Shogakukan has collected its chapters into individual tankōbon volumes. The first volume was released on April 12, 2018. As of June 10, 2022, eleven volumes have been released.

Volume list

References

External links
 

Japanese webcomics
Shogakukan manga
Shōnen manga
Webcomics in print
Yuri (genre) anime and manga